is a Japanese artistic gymnast who represented Japan at the 2020 Summer Olympics.  She is the 2021 World Champion on the balance beam.

Personal life 
Ashikawa was born in Fuji, Shizuoka, Japan in 2003.  She began gymnastics when she was a year old and began training at Mizutori Gymnasium when she was in second grade.

Career

Junior

2016–17 
In 2016 Ashikawa competed at the All-Japan Event Championships where she placed third on balance beam behind Asuka Teramoto and Kiko Kuwajima.  In 2018 she again competed at the All-Japan Event Championships and once again placed third on balance beam behind Teramoto and Natsumi Sasada.

2018 
In 2018 Ashikawa represented Japan at the Asian Junior Championships alongside Haruka Ikeda, Hinata Matsubara, Shoko Miyata, and Ayumi Niiyama.  They placed second in the team final behind China.  Individually Ashikawa placed fifth in the all-around, seventh on uneven bars, and sixth on balance beam.  At the All-Japan Event Championships Ashikawa placed ninth on balance beam during qualifications and did not qualify to the event final.  She ended the season competing at the World Cup trials where she placed second on balance beam behind Mana Oguchi.

Senior

2019 
Ashikawa turned senior in 2019.  She made her senior international debut at the 2019 City of Jesolo Trophy where she placed 16th in the all-around and seventh on uneven bars and balance beam.  At the All Japan Event Championships she placed sixth on balance beam.  In November she made her World Cup debut at the Cottbus World Cup where she won gold on balance beam ahead of Ukrainian Diana Varinska.

2020 
In February Ashikawa competed at the Melbourne World Cup where she once again won gold on balance beam, this time ahead of first-year senior Ondine Achampong of Great Britain.  She next competed at the Baku World Cup where she qualified to the balance beam final in first place; however event finals were canceled due to the COVID-19 pandemic in Azerbaijan.  The FIG later ruled that the results of qualification would be used for point distribution for Olympic qualification, meaning Ashikawa earned a perfect score of 90 and no other competitor could match her score on the balance beam.

2021 
In June Ashikawa was officially awarded an Olympic berth via the Apparatus World Cup series and competed at the 2020 Summer Olympics as an individual athlete.  She was originally the first reserve for the balance beam final but was able to compete when Larisa Iordache withdrew.  She finished sixth.

In October Ashikawa competed at the 2021 World Championships in Kitakyushu.  While there she won gold on the balance beam.  This was Japan's second world gold medal on the apparatus following Keiko Tanaka-Ikeda's win in 1954.  Ashikawa became the third Japanese woman to win a world title in artistic gymnastics following Tanaka-Ikeda and Mai Murakami.

Competitive history

References

External links 
 

2003 births
Living people
Japanese female artistic gymnasts
Sportspeople from Shizuoka Prefecture
Gymnasts at the 2020 Summer Olympics
Olympic gymnasts of Japan
World champion gymnasts
Medalists at the World Artistic Gymnastics Championships
21st-century Japanese women